Nikolai Anatolyevich Yevmenov (born 2 April 1962) is a Russian admiral currently serving as the commander-in-chief of the Russian Navy.

Biography 
Yevmenov was born on 2 April 1962 in Moscow.

Between 1995 and 1997 he studied at the N. G. Kuznetsov Naval Academy. Between 1997 and 1999 he commanded ballistic missile submarines in the Pacific Fleet. Between 1999 and 2006 he was chief of staff, deputy commander and subsequently commander of the 25th submarine division of the Pacific Fleet, having studied at the Military Academy of the General Staff of the Armed Forces of Russia during 2001 to 2003. In 2012 Yevmenov became deputy commander of the Northern Fleet, becoming commander in 2016 and being promoted to Admiral in 2017.

Yevmenov was appointed commander-in-chief of the Russian Navy on 3 May 2019 succeeding Admiral Vladimir Korolyov.In November, Yevmenov visited Japan. During his meeting with Hiroshi Yamamura, the Chief of Staff of the Japanese Maritime Self Defence Force, a picture of the two men was taken against the background of a portrait of Togo Heihachiro, the Japanese Commander-in-Chief of the Combined Fleet who defeated Russian fleet during the Battle of Tsushima, Russo-Japanese War and a controversy ensued.

Sanctions 
In February 2022, Yevmenov was put on the European Union sanctions list for being "responsible for actively supporting and implementing actions and policies that undermine and threaten the territorial integrity, sovereignty and independence of Ukraine as well as the stability or security in Ukraine."

Awards
Order of Alexander Nevsky (2016)
Order of Military Merit (Russia) (2006)
Order of Naval Merit (Russia) (2015)

Citations

References 
 Адмирал Николай Евменов на сайте Минобороны России
 Блог Пелевина Владимира Александровича
 Моряки и корабли
 Штурм глубины — K-490
 Мурманский вестник
 Центр военно-политических исследований 
 Выступление перед личным составом

    
    
    

1962 births
Russian admirals
Commanders-in-chief of the Russian Navy
Recipients of the Order of Military Merit (Russia)
Living people
Recipients of the Order of Naval Merit (Russia)
Recipients of the Order of Alexander Nevsky
N. G. Kuznetsov Naval Academy alumni
Military Academy of the General Staff of the Armed Forces of Russia alumni
Russian individuals subject to European Union sanctions